Renacimiento District is a district (distrito) of Chiriquí Province in Panama. The population according to the 2000 census was 18,257. The district covers a total area of 428 km². The capital lies at the city of Río Sereno.

Administrative divisions
Renacimiento District is divided administratively into the following corregimientos:

Río Sereno (capital)
Breñón
Cañas Gordas
Monte Lirio
Plaza de Caisán
Santa Cruz
Dominical
Santa Clara

References

Districts of Panama
Chiriquí Province